GW2 may refer to:
 Gears of War 2, a science-fiction third-person shooter
 Geometry Wars: Retro Evolved², a multidirectional shooter video game created by Bizarre Creations
 Guild Wars 2, a massively multiplayer online role-playing game by ArenaNet
 Iraq War of 2003, or Gulf War 2
 Plants vs. Zombies: Garden Warfare 2, a 2016 video game by PopCap